CHRQ-FM (106.9 FM) is a radio station that broadcasts a community radio format to the Listuguj, Quebec area. Licensed to Listuguj, Quebec, the station is owned by Gespegewag Communications Society.

The station was licensed in 1990 and was spearheaded by Donna Isaac.

References

External links
CHRQ-FM history - Canadian Communication Foundation
 

Hrq
Hrq
Radio stations established in 1990
1990 establishments in Quebec